Leo Carle (born 6 June 1980 in Sydney, New South Wales, Australia) is an Australian football and Futsal player currently playing for AC United in the Southern Districts Football Association Premier League Competition. Carle plays predominantly as an attacking midfielder. He is a former captain of the Australian national futsal team. 

Carle has played in the Australian A-League for Central Coast Mariners and for Club Nacional de Football in Uruguay.

Personal life
He is the elder brother of former Socceroo Nick Carle, and they are of Chilean and Uruguayan descent.

References

1980 births
Living people
Soccer players from Sydney
Australian people of Chilean descent
Sportspeople of Chilean descent
Australian people of Uruguayan descent
Sportspeople of Uruguayan descent
Association football midfielders
Australian expatriate soccer players
National Soccer League (Australia) players
APIA Leichhardt FC players
Blacktown City FC players
Bonnyrigg White Eagles FC players
Central Coast Mariners FC players
Club Nacional de Football players
Marconi Stallions FC players
Sydney Olympic FC players
Parramatta FC players
Rockdale Ilinden FC players
Bankstown City FC players
Expatriate footballers in Uruguay
A-League Men players
Australian soccer players
Wollongong United FC players